The Tower of Llanes (Spanish: Torreón de Llanes) is a medieval tower located in Llanes, Spain.

Conservation 
The limestone structure has the heritage listing of Bien de Interés Cultural and has been protected since 1876.

See also 

 List of Bien de Interés Cultural in Asturias

References

External links 

Bien de Interés Cultural landmarks in Asturias
Towers in Spain